Marco Torcivia (born 4 May 1982), is an Italian futsal player who plays for Acireale and the Italian national futsal team.

References

External links
UEFA profile

1982 births
Living people
Italian men's futsal players
Sportspeople from Palermo